Real Love is the debut studio album by Derek Johnson. Jesus Culture Music alongside Sparrow Records released the album on April 7, 2015. Jeremy Edwardson produced the album.

Critical reception

Awarding the album three and a half stars for CCM Magazine, Grace S. Aspinwall says, "A bit more innovation would have been nice, but his performances are passionate and moving." Marcus Hathcock, rating the album four stars at New Release Tuesday, writes, "Real Love is a solid offering by a fantastic vocalist and worshipper in Johnson." Indicating in a four and a half star review by Worship Leader, Jay Akins states, "Derek has given the Church a wonderful new body of Jesus-and-gospel-centered worship music...Strong vocals, great music, and powerful life-changing truth make this record a must for the modern Church."

Giving the album four stars by Jono Davies from Louder Than the Music, describes, "this is all about one thing, and that is songs that take the listener closer to God and thankfully Derek Johnson captures that brilliantly." Writing a review for Christian Review Magazine, Leah St. John rating the album four stars, says, "Real Love is a well produced release that the presents honest and worshipful lyrics, passionate vocals, and great musicianship." Rating the album a nine out of ten for Cross Rhythms, Tony Cummings writes, "Derek has demonstrated he has a lot more excellent material."

Track listing

Personnel
Adapted from AllMusic.

 Brandon Aaronson — bass
 Jonathan Berlin — mastering
 Jeremy Edwardson — engineer, keyboards, producer
 Andrew Ehrenzeller — background vocals
 Mary Kat Ehrenzeller — background vocals
 Josh Fisher — drums
 Jeremy S.H. Griffith — mixing
 Joanna Hampton — background vocals
 Andrew Jackson — engineer, keyboards, production assistant
 Derek Johnson — acoustic guitar, primary artist, vocals
 Gabe Kossol — background vocals
 Tore Kulleseid — guitar, keyboard, production assistant
 Jeffrey Kunde — guitar
 Banning Liebscher — executive producer
 Ian McIntosh — keyboards
 Kim Walker-Smith — executive producer

Charts

References

2015 debut albums
Sparrow Records albums
Derek Johnson albums